Bilal Yener Arıca (born 28 February 1992) is a Turkish-Dutch footballer who plays as a midfielder for Bayburt Özel İdarespor.

Club career 
Born 28 February 1992 in Istanbul, Turkey, Yener Arıca moved to The Hague, in the Netherlands with his family, where he grew up. He attended the famous Ajax Academy in Amsterdam debuting for the D2 youth team in 2003. He has been on the reserve squad for AFC Ajax since 2011, and after two seasons on the reserves list he was however unable to break through into the first team, and decided to move to Turkey, signing with Kayserispor where he was given the number 14 shirt.

He made his Süper Lig debut for Kayserispor against Karabükspor in the 3-1 away loss, coming on as a 53' minute substitute for Salih Dursun.

After a season at Turkish second division Altınordu SK, he returned to Holland in summer 2016 to join Almere City.

Personal life 
Yener Arıca was born in Küçükçekmece, Istanbul, Turkey to both Turkish parents, with whom he moved to the Netherlands where he grew up. He holds both Turkish and Dutch citizenship, and has yet to make any appearances for either national team.

References

External links
 Profile - Turkish Football Federation
 Profile - Voetbal International
 

1992 births
Living people
People from Küçükçekmece
Footballers from Istanbul
Dutch people of Turkish descent
Association football midfielders
Turkish footballers
Dutch footballers
Süper Lig players
Kayserispor footballers
Altınordu F.K. players
Almere City FC players
Eerste Divisie players